Downtown East can refer to:

Downtown East, Minneapolis
Downtown East/Metrodome (Metro Transit station), a light rail station in the above neighborhood
Downtown Eastside, Vancouver
Downtown East Village, Calgary
NTUC Downtown East, a lifestyle hub in northeast Singapore